Juha Rissanen (born 13 November 1958) is a Finnish footballer. He competed in the men's tournament at the 1980 Summer Olympics.

References

External links
 

1958 births
Living people
Finnish footballers
Finland international footballers
Olympic footballers of Finland
Footballers at the 1980 Summer Olympics
People from Kuopio
Association football defenders
Sportspeople from North Savo
Koparit players